Like all municipalities of Puerto Rico, Villalba is subdivided into administrative units called barrios, which are roughly comparable to minor civil divisions, (and means wards or boroughs or neighborhoods in English). The barrios and subbarrios, in turn, are further subdivided into smaller local populated place areas/units called sectores (sectors in English). The types of sectores may vary, from normally sector to urbanización to reparto to barriada to residencial, among others. Some sectors appear in two barrios.

List of sectors by barrio

Caonillas Abajo
Carretera 150
Hoyito Santiago
Sector Cerro Gordo
Sector El Higuero 
Sector La Vega

Caonillas Arriba
Carretera 151 (intersection with Carretera 553)
Sector San Miguel
Sector Caonillas
Sector Dajaos
Sector El Limón
Sector La Ortiga

Hato Puerco Abajo 

Camarones Abajo
El Lago
Jovitos Sur
La Ferretería
La Gallera
Sector Hatillo Viejo
Urbanización Estancias de Santa Rosa

Hato Puerco Arriba 
1ra. Extensión Alturas de Villalba 
2da. Extensión Alturas de Villalba
Carretera 150
Carretera 151 (intersection with Carretera 550)
Carretera 560 
Carretera 561
Comunidad Toa Vaca
Egida Villalba Elderly Apartments
Jovitos
Sector Apeaderos
Sector Camarones
Sector El Nuevo Pino 
Sector Los Pinos
Urbanización La Vega
Urbanización Monte Bello
Urbanización Portales del Alba

Vacas 
Carretera 561
El Mayoral Apartments
La Pulga
Sector Hacienda El Mayoral
Sector La Sierra
Sector Mogote 
Sector Vacas
Sector Vista Alegre
Urbanización Estancias del Mayoral
Urbanización Estancias del Mayoral II
Urbanización Luceros de Villalba
Urbanización Vista Alegre

Villalba Abajo 
Barriada Borinquen
Carretera 149 (intersection with Carretera 514)
Carretera 149
Corillo
Egida Villalba Housing for the Elderly
El Semil Abajo
Hacienda Juanita
Hogar Las Margaritas Dos
Residencial Efraín Suárez
Residencial Enudio Negrón 
Residencial Maximino Miranda
Sector Hacienda Sosa
Sector Jagueyes Abajo 
Sector Jagueyes Arriba 
Sector Romero 
Sector Tierra Santa 
Urbanización Estancias de Valle Hermoso
Urbanización Las Alondras
Urbanización Nabori
Urbanización Quintas del Alba
Urbanización Sagrado Corazón
Urbanización Tierra Santa
Urbanización Valle Escondido
Urbanización Valle Hermoso
Urbanización Villa Laura 
Urbanización Vista Bella
Villalba Apartments

Villalba Arriba
Carretera 149 
Carretera 547
Sector Aceituna
Sector Chichón
Sector El Cercao
Sector Hacienda El Semil Arriba
Sector La Capilla
Sector Lajita
Sector Palmarejo
Urbanización Alturas del Alba

Villalba barrio-pueblo
Barriada Cooperativa
Barriada Nueva
Calle Barceló 
Calle Figueroa
Calle Luchetti
Calle Muñoz Rivera
Calle Sharton 
Calle Vencebil
Calle Walter Mck Jones
Carretera 149
El Coquí
Hogar San Cristobal 
Sector Barrio Chino
Sector Palmarejo
Urbanización Villa Alba

See also

 List of communities in Puerto Rico

References

Villalba
Villalba